Robert Davis Farmhouse was a historic farmhouse located near Millsboro, Sussex County, Delaware. It was built about 1900, as a two-story, five bay, single pile, wood-frame building with asbestos siding.  It had a gable roof, with a cross gable and lancet window.  Also on the property were two contributing log corn cribs.

It was added to the National Register of Historic Places in 1979. It is listed on the Delaware Cultural and Historic Resources GIS system as destroyed or demolished.

References

Houses on the National Register of Historic Places in Delaware
Houses completed in 1900
Houses in Sussex County, Delaware
Nanticoke tribe
National Register of Historic Places in Sussex County, Delaware